Iván Villar Martínez (born 9 July 1997) is a Spanish professional footballer who plays as a goalkeeper for RC Celta de Vigo.

Club career
Villar was born in Aldán, Pontevedra, Galicia, and joined RC Celta de Vigo's youth setup in 2008, from Rápido Bahía CF. On 13 October 2013, he made his senior debut with the reserves at the age of just 16, starting in a 1–0 Segunda División B home win against Cultural y Deportiva Leonesa.

On 4 September 2014, Villar extended his contract until 2019, but only featured regularly for the B side during the 2015–16 season. On 14 May 2017, he made his first-team – and La Liga – debut, starting in the 3–1 away loss to Deportivo Alavés.

In July 2017, Villar was definitely promoted to the main squad after refusing to play with the second team. The following 25 January, he extended his contract until 2023 and was immediately loaned to fellow top-division club Levante UD for six months.

At the start of the 2020–21 campaign, Villar was first choice under manager Óscar García, by virtue of being Celta's only fit goalkeeper. On 11 August 2021, he was loaned to Segunda División side CD Leganés for one year.

Villar began 2022–23 as backup to Agustín Marchesín, newly-arrived from FC Porto. However, after the Argentine suffered a serious injury in February, he became the starter.

Career statistics

Honours
Spain U23
Summer Olympics silver medal: 2020

References

External links

1997 births
Living people
People from Cangas, Pontevedra
Sportspeople from the Province of Pontevedra
Spanish footballers
Footballers from Galicia (Spain)
Association football goalkeepers
La Liga players
Segunda División players
Segunda División B players
Celta de Vigo B players
RC Celta de Vigo players
Levante UD footballers
CD Leganés players
Spain youth international footballers
Footballers at the 2020 Summer Olympics
Olympic footballers of Spain
Olympic medalists in football
Olympic silver medalists for Spain
Medalists at the 2020 Summer Olympics